Chrysler has used the PowerTech name on the following engines:
 
 The 2.4 L Chrysler Neon engine I4 engine
 The 2.5 L AMC straight-4 engine I4 engine 
 The 3.7 L Chrysler PowerTech engine V6 engine
 The 4.0 L AMC Straight 6 engine I6 engine
 The 4.7 L Chrysler PowerTech engine V8 engine